Stella Umeh (born 27 May 1975) is a Canadian former artistic gymnast and current actress and performer. She competed at the 1992 Summer Olympics placing 16th in the all-around. She is of Guyanese and Nigerian descent.

Gymnastics career 
Umeh's first big international meet was at the 1989 American Cup in Fairfax, Virginia where she finished fifth. She then competed at the 1990 Commonwealth Games but was originally an alternate. She won a gold medal with the Canadian team. She competed at the American Cup again in 1991 but placed 8th. She went to the 1991 World Artistic Gymnastics Championships in Indianapolis, Indiana, USA. She finished 17th in the all-around. In 1992, Stella started her season at the American Cup in Orlando, Florida, USA and finished 7th. In April, she competed at the 1992 World Artistic Gymnastics Championships in Paris, France. She qualified to Vault and Beam finals but placed 8th and 5th. Later, she qualified to the 1992 Summer Olympics in Barcelona, Spain. She finished 16th in the all-around and 10th with the Canadian team. In 1993, she went to Worlds and placed 15th AA and 8th in the FX final. In 1994, she went to the 1994 Commonwealth Games and won 2 golds and 2 silvers as well as placing 4th and 5th in Floor and Beam finals.

College career 
In 1994, she accepted a college scholarship to UCLA and started attending the school in 1994.

Throughout her four years at college, she won three golds, three silvers and one bronze at the NCAA Championships. She was twice the Pac-12 conference all-around champion.

Acting and Entertainment 
Stella studied Theatre at the American Academy of Dramatic Arts in the hopes of becoming an actress. In 2000, she joined Cirque du Soleil and performed Mystère in Las Vegas. In 2002, she performed in Fire Within and then in Varekai as a triple trapeze in 2003. She played small roles in Ghostly Encounters and Delroy Kincaid. She recently had a leading role in a stage play called, 'Pinteresque' which will be in the SummerWorks Performance Festival.

Currently, Stella lives in Australia.

References

External links

1975 births
Living people
Sportspeople from Mississauga
Gymnasts from Toronto
Canadian female artistic gymnasts
Olympic gymnasts of Canada
Gymnasts at the 1992 Summer Olympics
Gymnasts at the 1990 Commonwealth Games
Gymnasts at the 1994 Commonwealth Games
Commonwealth Games gold medallists for Canada
Commonwealth Games silver medallists for Canada
Black Canadian sportspeople
Canadian sportspeople of Guyanese descent
Canadian sportspeople of Nigerian descent
Commonwealth Games medallists in gymnastics
Black Canadian sportswomen
UCLA Bruins women's gymnasts
Medallists at the 1990 Commonwealth Games
Medallists at the 1994 Commonwealth Games